Amacuro Delta is a river delta in Delta Amacuro State, Venezuela, being the mouth of the Amacuro River.

River deltas
Landforms of Venezuela
Landforms of South America
Geography of Delta Amacuro